The Zeiss Sonnar is a photographic lens originally designed by Dr. Ludwig Bertele in 1929 and  patented by Zeiss Ikon. It was notable for its relatively light weight, simple design and fast aperture.

The name "Sonnar" is derived from the German word "Sonne", meaning sun. Sontheim's coat of arms includes a symbol of the sun. Nettel merged with August Nagel's  in 1919. The resulting  AG in Stuttgart was one of the companies that merged to form the Zeiss Ikon AG in 1926.

When the modern Zeiss lens had been designed by Bertele, Zeiss re-used the old Nettel tradename in order to build on the sun association to emphasize on the lens' large aperture, which was much greater than many other lenses available at the time.

The first Zeiss production Sonnar was a 1:2.0 50 mm lens with six elements in three groups created for the Zeiss Contax I rangefinder camera in 1932.

Compared to Planar designs the Sonnars had more aberrations, but with fewer glass-to-air surfaces it had better contrast and less flare. Though compared to the earlier Tessar design, its faster aperture and lower chromatic aberration was a significant improvement.

The Sonnar has proved to be incompatible in shorter focal lengths with 35mm single-lens reflex (SLR) cameras due to the space taken up by an SLR's mirror. For this reason it has been used most commonly with rangefinder cameras, though Sonnar lenses with longer focal lengths still appear on SLR cameras, most notably the 150 mm and 250 mm lenses for the medium format (MF) Hasselblad V-system. Some portrait Sonnars were also made for large format (LF) cameras, presumably the press cameras – like Sonnar 1:5.6 250 mm for 9×12 cm (4×5") format. Though these lenses were quite heavy (> 2 kg) and large, they were optimised for working on a full aperture with the same sharpness and contrast as on smaller apertures. The coverage of these lenses was also not as  good as many similar focal length lenses which limited the use of camera movements. although these are not generally too important for portrait work.

The Sonnar design has been extensively copied by other lens manufacturers, due to its excellent sharpness, low production cost and fast speed. The Soviet factory KMZ produced several lenses that used the Sonnar formula: The KMZ Jupiter 3,  Jupiter-8, and Jupiter-9 are direct copies of the Zeiss Sonnar 1:1.5 50 mm, 1:2.0 50 mm and 1:2.0 85 mm respectively.

A zoom lens derivative of the Sonnar, the Vario-Sonnar also exists, in which a number of lens groups are replaced with floating pairs of lens groups.

The Vario-Sonnar is a Carl Zeiss photographic lens design named in relation to the Zeiss Sonnar.  This lens type has a variable focal length which can replace a series of lenses for a certain picture format.

See also 
 Biotar
 Tessar
 Planar
 Biogon
 
 
 Hologon
 Photographic lens design

External links 
 Vario-Sonnar diagram

References 

 Antique and Classic Cameras Sonnar Lens Types for Leica mount

Photographic lens designs
Sonnar